The Segal Centre for Performing Arts, formerly the Saidye Bronfman Centre for the Arts, is a theatre in Montreal, Quebec, Canada. It is located at 5170 chemin de la Côte-Sainte-Catherine, in the borough of Côte-des-Neiges–Notre-Dame-de-Grâce.

The building houses the Segal Theatre, the Academy of Performing Arts, CinemaSpace, Studio, and the Dora Wasserman Yiddish Theatre.

History

The Saidye Bronfman Centre
In 1967, the children of Saidye Bronfman gave the theatre to the local community in recognition of their mother's long association with and patronage of the arts. The building that houses the theatre was designed in 1967 by Montreal architect Phyllis Lambert, a daughter of Saidye Bronfman.

The Segal Centre for Performing Arts
Following the winding-down of the Samuel and Saidye Bronfman Foundation, in 2007 the Saidye Bronfman Centre was renamed the Segal Centre for Performing Arts in acknowledgement of the financial support of Leanor and Alvin Segal in partnership with the Bronfman family. Uniting theatre, music, dance, cinema and arts education under one roof, its mission is to promote the creation, production and presentation of professional artistic work, support emerging artists and foster intercultural understanding through the arts.

The Segal Theatre is now an English-language theatre. It has expanded to become a nationally recognized venue for the performing arts with a focus on creation, innovation, diversity, and cross-cultural collaborations. Driven by a belief in the power of the arts to strengthen and connect communities, the Segal's programming emphasizes original interpretations of popular classics and contemporary works, new Canadian musicals, and engaging productions with universal appeal.

In 2008, the Segal Theatre co-produced the original musical Houdini with the Montreal Highlights Festival (dir. Bryna Wasserman). It was remounted later that year by the Montreal International Jazz Festival, the first play ever to be featured at the Festival. It was wildly successful with both French and English audiences as well as critics.

Other highlights include Sam Shepard’s Buried Child (2009) which was co-produced with theNational Arts Centre (NAC) and directed byPeter Hinton, Artistic Director of English Theatre at the NAC. Old Wicked Songs (2010, dir. Bryna Wasserman) by Jon Marans was co-produced with Théâtre du Rideau Vert and played in French as Une musique inquiétante before the original cast and crew moved to the Segal to perform the production in English.

The Segal Centre has become a major player in the development and production of new Canadian musicals. In June 2015, the Centre premiered Belles Soeurs: The Musical based on the play by Michel Tremblay with book and lyrics by René Richard Cyr, music by Daniel Bélanger, English adaptation of book and lyrics by Neil Bartram and Brian Hill, and directed by René Richard Cyr. A co-production with Copa de Oro, Belles Soeurs went on a national tour and won the Capital Critics Circle Award for Best Production after its stop at the National Arts Centre in Ottawa.

In June, 2015, the Segal Centre launched a world premiere of a musical adaptation of Mordecai Richler's novel, The Apprenticeship of Duddy Kravitz, starring Alberta-born Kenneth James Stewart as the infamous Duddy, who follows his grandfather's advice to own some land, regardless of the personal consequences.

In October 2016, the Segal Centre premiered Prom Queen: The Musical based on the true story of Marc Hall, the Ontario teenager who took his Catholic School Board to court when it refused to let him attend prom with his boyfriend. Produced by Marcia Kash with book by Kent Staines, lyrics by Akiva Romer-Segal, music by Colleen Dauncey, musical direction by Mark Camilleri, choreography by Sean Cheesman, Prom Queen: The Musical won the Playwrights Guild of Canada’s Stage West Pechet Family Musical Award at the Tom Hendry Awards in 2016.

The Segal Centre is also an artistic resource and hub for Montreal’s diverse theatre community of independent and emerging artists to create explore and grow. Its second stage, The Studio, has been a venue for SideMart Theatrical Grocery; the Power Jazz series; and the Segal’s popular Broadway Café events, as well as guest programming.

In addition, the Segal Centre for Performing Arts houses the Dora Wasserman Yiddish Theatre, celebrating almost sixty years of dramatizing the Jewish experience.

The current Artistic Director is Lisa Rubin, who took up the position in 2014.

Mandate

The Segal Centre for Performing Arts is a not-for-profit theatre company dedicated to nurturing, producing and presenting world-class English-language theatre, and to showcasing professional artists from Montreal and around the world.

Founded in 1967, the Segal Centre has expanded to become a nationally recognized venue for the performing arts, a training ground for emerging artists and a one-of-a-kind destination for the best of jazz concerts, dance, cinema and Jewish arts and culture.

Awards

META Awards

Outstanding Set Design - Eo Sharp, RED

Outstanding Production - Sherlock Holmes

Outstanding Direction - Andrew Shaver, Sherlock Holmes

Outstanding Costume Design - James Lavoie, Sherlock Holmes

Outstanding Lighting Design - Luc Prairie, Sherlock Holmes

Outstanding Sound Design - Jesse Ash, Sherlock Holmes

Outstanding Supporting Performance - Julie Tamiko Manning, Othello

Outstanding Supporting Performance - Daniel Brochu, Othello

Outstanding Direction - Micheline Chevrier, Top Girls

Outstanding Lead Performance - Leni Parker, Top Girls

Outstanding Set Design - Max-Otto Fauteux, Top Girls

Outstanding Costume Design - Mylène Chabrol, Top Girls

Outstanding Lighting Design - Martin Sirois, Top Girls

Outstanding Emerging Artist - Aiza Ntibarikure, Ain’t Misbehavin’

Outstanding Set Design - Michael Gianfrancesco, Funny Girl

Outstanding Costume Design - Michael Gianfrancesco, Funny Girl

Outstanding PACT Production, Travesties

Outstanding Set Design - Pierre-Étienne Locas, Travesties

Outstanding Costume Design - Louise Bourret, Travesties

Outstanding Lighting Design - Kimberly Purtell, We Are Not Alone (Crow’s Theatre)

Outstanding Original Composition - Matthew Barber and Justin Rutledge, The Graduate

Outstanding Community Production, The Producers

Capital Critics Circle Award (Ottawa)

Best Professional Play (2016), Belles Soeurs: The Musical

Masques Awards

Best English Language Production - I Am My Own Wife

Best English Production - The Glass Menagerie

Best English Production - Salt Water Moon

Best English Production - Betrayal

Best Actress(es) - Viola Léger and Linda Sorgini in Grace and Glorie

Lifetime Achievement Award to Dora Wasserman

AQCT French Critics

Best English Language Production - Amadeus

MECCA Awards

Outstanding Costume Design - James Lavoie, Lies My Father Told Me

Outstanding Direction - Greg Kramer, Cat on a Hot Tin Roof

Best Sound Design, Rob Denton, The Satchmo’ Suite

Set Design, Yannik Larivée, I Am My Own Wife/Amadeus

Best Actor, Brett Christopher, I Am My Own Wife

Best Director, Alexandre Marine, Amadeus

Best Professional Production, The Importance of Being Earnest

Best Director, Perter Hinton, A Doll House

Best Lighting, Spike Lyne, My Old Lady

Best Set Design, Peter Hartwell, The Importance of Being Earnest

Best Actor - Martha Henry in Rose

Best Professional Production - Hedda Gabler

Best Actor - Don Anderson in De Profundis (Gravy Bath)

Best Semi Pro\Amateur - Kali Yuga (Gravy Bath)

Best Actor - Gareth Armstrong in Shylock

Best Actress - Michelle Monteith in The Glass Menagerie

Best Director - Madd Harold for Shakespeare's Coriolanus (Gravy Bath)

Best Semi Pro\Amateur - Shakespeare's Coriolanus (Gravy Bath)

Best Ensemble - Theatre Smith-Gilmour for Chekhov's Shorts

Best Actor - Pierre Brault in Blood on the Moon

Best Professional Production - Salt Water Moon

Best Actress - Uta Hagen in Collected Stories

Best Semi-professional Production - The Threepenny Opera (Yiddish Theatre)

Best Production - After the Dance

Award of Distinction to Bryna Wasserman

Best New Ensemble to Montreal Young Company

Best Semi-Professional Production - The Great Houdini (Yiddish Theatre)

Best English Production - Betrayal

The MECCAs are awarded by the Montreal English Critics Circle

The Masques are awarded by l’Académie Québecoise du Théâtre

See also
Jews in Montreal

References

External links
Segal Centre for Performing Arts | web site

Theatres in Montreal
Côte-des-Neiges–Notre-Dame-de-Grâce
Jews and Judaism in Montreal